Mochlus sundevallii, also known commonly as Peters' eyelid skink, Peters' writhing skink, and Sundevall's writhing skink, is a species of lizard in the family Scincidae. The species is endemic to Sub-Saharan Africa.

Etymology
The specific name, sundevallii, is in honor of Swedish zoologist Carl Jakob Sundevall.

Geographic range
M. sundevallii is found in Angola, Botswana, Democratic Republic of Congo, Eswatini, Ethiopia, Kenya, Malawi, Mozambique, Namibia, Somalia, South Africa, Tanzania, Uganda, Zambia, and Zimbabwe. The Reptile Database also lists Central African Republic, Sudan, and possibly South Sudan.

Habitat

Description
Dorsally, it is grayish or light brown, with dark brown speckling. Ventrally, it is uniformly cream-colored, except for the underside of the tail, which may have speckling.

Reproduction
M. sundevallii is oviparous.

References

Mochlus
Skinks of Africa
Reptiles of Angola
Reptiles of Botswana
Vertebrates of Burundi
Reptiles of the Democratic Republic of the Congo
Reptiles of Eswatini
Reptiles of Ethiopia
Reptiles of Kenya
Reptiles of Malawi
Reptiles of Mozambique
Reptiles of Namibia
Vertebrates of Rwanda
Reptiles of Somalia
Reptiles of South Africa
Reptiles of Tanzania
Reptiles of Uganda
Reptiles of Zambia
Reptiles of Zimbabwe
Reptiles described in 1849
Taxa named by Andrew Smith (zoologist)